Kitty Chicha Amatayakul (born 5 August 1993), born Kanyawee Phumsiridol, is a Thai actress, singer and model. She was a former member of the girl group Kiss Me Five from Kamikaze Records and best known for her role as Nanno in Netflix's anthology series Girl from Nowhere.

Life and career 
Amatayakul was born on August 5, 1993. She attended Grade 4 at Chitralada School. She attended high school at an international school under the British Curriculum (IGCSE) at the age of 15 before entering higher education in the Faculty of Business at Assumption University and Faculty of Law at Ramkhamhaeng University.

In 2010, Amatayakul joined Kamikaze records as a member of the pop group Kiss Me Five, which also included the members Bow Maylada, Bam Pakakanya, Gail Natcha and Mild Krittiya.

Starting in 2018, Amatayakul starred as the main character, Nanno, in the drama anthology series Girl from Nowhere. The second season of Girl from Nowhere premiered on Netflix in 2021, exposing Amatayakul to international audiences.

Filmography

Television

Film

Music videos

References

External links 
 
 

1993 births
Living people
Chicha Amatayakul
Chicha Amatayakul
Chicha Amatayakul
Chicha Amatayakul
Chicha Amatayakul
Chicha Amatayakul